The 2023 Big 12 Men's Basketball Tournament was a postseason men's basketball tournament for the Big 12 Conference. It was played from March 8 to 11 in Kansas City, Missouri at the T-Mobile Center. Texas won the tournament to earn the conference's automatic bid to the 2023 NCAA Tournament. The tournament was sponsored by Phillips 66.

Seeds 
All ten teams will participate in the tournament. It will be the final season with the 10 team bracket format as the Big 12 will expand to 14 teams for the 2023–24 season before going to 12 in 2024–25 with the departures of Oklahoma and Texas. The top six teams will receive a first-round bye.

Teams are seeded by record within the conference, with a tiebreaker system to seed teams with identical conference records.

Schedule

Bracket

All-Tournament Team

Most Outstanding Player – Dylan Disu, Texas

References 

Tournament
Big 12 men's basketball tournament
Big 12 men's basketball tournament
Big 12 men's basketball tournament
Basketball competitions in Kansas City, Missouri
College basketball tournaments in Missouri